Wiesbaden is an electoral constituency (German: Wahlkreis) represented in the Bundestag. It elects one member via first-past-the-post voting. Under the current constituency numbering system, it is designated as constituency 179. It is located in southwestern Hesse, comprising the city of Wiesbaden.

Wiesbaden was created for the inaugural 1949 federal election. Since 2017, it has been represented by Ingmar Jung of the Christian Democratic Union (CDU).

Geography
Wiesbaden is located in southwestern Hesse. As of the 2021 federal election, it is coterminous with the independent city of Wiesbaden.

History
Wiesbaden was created in 1949. In the 1949 election, it was Hesse constituency 13 in the numbering system. From 1953 through 1976, it was number 138. From 1980 through 1998, it was number 136. In the 2002 and 2005 elections, it was number 180. Since the 2009 election, it has been number 179. Its borders have not changed since its creation.

Members
The constituency was first represented by Victor-Emanuel Preusker of the Free Democratic Party (FDP) from 1949 to 1957. Elisabeth Schwarzhaupt of the Christian Democratic Union (CDU) was elected in 1957. Karl Wittrock of the Social Democratic Party (SPD) won it in 1961, and was succeeded in 1965 by fellow party member Karl-Walter Fritz. Horst Krockert of the SPD then served from 1969 to 1980. Rudi Schmitt of the SPD was representative for a single term from 1980 to 1983 before Hannelore Rönsch won the constituency for the CDU. Heidemarie Wieczorek-Zeul regained it for the SPD in 1998 and served until 2009. Kristina Schröder of the CDU was then representative from 2009 to 2017. Ingmar Jung of the CDU was elected in 2017.

Election results

2021 election

2017 election

2013 election

2009 election

References

Federal electoral districts in Hesse
1949 establishments in West Germany
Constituencies established in 1949
Wiesbaden